Abdullah Al-Dossari (born 27 August 1993) is a Saudi Arabian professional footballer who plays as a midfielder for Al-Arabi.

Club career
Al-Dossari started his career at Sdoos where he spent four seasons at the club. On 15 August 2017, Al-Dossari joined Al-Kawkab, where he spent one season. On 20 August 2018, Al-Dossari joined Al-Mujazzal. On 22 July 2019, Al-Dossari joined Al-Batin. He made 16 appearances and scored twice as Al-Batin were crowned champions and earned promotion to the Pro League. On 5 October 2020, Al-Dossari joined relegated side Al-Fayha. He scored 6 times in 32 appearances and helped Al-Fayha finish second and earn promotion to the Pro League. On 3 July 2021, Al-Dossari renewed his contract with Al-Fayha. On 23 July 2022, Al-Dossari joined First Division side Al-Arabi.

Honours
Al-Batin
MS League: 2019–20

Al-Fayha
MS League runner-up: 2020–21

References

External links
 
 

Living people
1993 births
Association football midfielders
Saudi Arabian footballers
Sdoos Club players
Al-Kawkab FC players
Al-Mujazzal Club players
Al Batin FC players
Al-Fayha FC players
Al-Arabi SC (Saudi Arabia) players
Saudi Second Division players
Saudi First Division League players
Saudi Professional League players